Bareilly Lok Sabha constituency is one of the 80 Lok Sabha (parliamentary) constituencies in Uttar Pradesh state in northern India.

Assembly segments 
Presently, Bareilly Lok Sabha constituency comprises five Vidhan Sabha (legislative assembly) segments. These are:

Members of Parliament 

^bypoll

Election results

See also 
 Bareilly district
 List of Constituencies of the Lok Sabha

Notes

References

External links 
 Bareilly lok sabha  constituency election 2019 result details

Lok Sabha constituencies in Uttar Pradesh
Politics of Bareilly district